Dominic O'Sullivan (born 18 July 1970) is a New Zealand-Irish-Australian political scientist and Honorary Fellow of the Royal Society of New Zealand. , he works at Charles Sturt University.

Academic career

O'Sullivan currently works at Charles Sturt University where he is a professor of political science. O'Sullivan is also an adjunct professor in the Center for Maori Health at AUT University. Prior to his work at Charles Sturt University, he was a senior teacher and research fellow at the University of Waikato where he completed his PhD titled Faith, politics and reconciliation: the Roman Catholic Church, New Zealand Maori and indigenous Australians. O’Sullivan graduated from Rosmini College, Auckland in 1988.

O'Sullivan's primary area of interest is the politics relating to indigenous peoples.

Selected publications 
 O’Sullivan, D. Beyond Biculturalism: the Politics of an Indigenous Minority. Wellington. Huia Publishers, 2007
 Bishop, Russell, Dominic O'Sullivan, and Mere Berryman. Scaling up Education Reform: Addressing the Politics of Disparity. New Zealand Council for Educational Research. PO Box 3237, Wellington 6140 New Zealand, 2010.
 O'Sullivan, Dominic. "The treaty of Waitangi in contemporary New Zealand politics." Australian Journal of Political Science 43, no. 2 (2008): 317–331.
 O'Sullivan, Dominic. "Needs, rights, nationhood, and the politics of indigeneity." MAI Review LW 1, no. 1 (2006): 12.
 O’Sullivan, D. Indigeneity: a politics of potential – Australia, Fiji and New Zealand. Bristol. Policy Press, 2017.
 O’Sullivan, D. Indigenous Health: power, politics and citizenship. Melbourne. Australian Scholarly Publishing, 2015.
 O’Sullivan, D. Faith Politics and Reconciliation: Catholicism and the Politics of Indigeneity. Wellington. Huia Publishers and Adelaide. ATF Press, 2005
 O’Sullivan, D. Sharing the Sovereign: Indigenous Peoples, Recognition, Treaties and the State. Singapore. Palgrave Macmillan, 2021
 O’Sullivan, D. ‘We Are All Here to Stay’: Citizenship, Sovereignty and the UN Declaration on the Rights of Indigenous Peoples. Canberra. ANU Press, 2020
 O’Sullivan, D. and Piper, C. Turanga Ngatahi: Standing Together: The Catholic Diocese of Hamilton 1840–2005. Wellington. Dunmore Publishing, 2005
 O’Sullivan, D. ‘Postcolonialism’ in Hayward, J. (ed.) New Zealand Government and Politics. Melbourne. Oxford University Press, 2015
 O’Sullivan, D. ‘Maori self-determination and a liberal theory of indigeneity’. In Indigenous Self-Determination: Theoretical and Practical Approaches. Marc Woons (ed). Bristol. E-International Relations. 2014, pp. 64–71

Personal life
Born to Tui Walsh and Sir Vincent O'Sullivan. He is Māori, of Te Rarawa, Ngāti Kahu descent.

References

External links
 
  

Living people
New Zealand academics
New Zealand political scientists
New Zealand emigrants to Australia
1970 births
Te Rarawa people
Ngāti Kahu people
Academic staff of Charles Sturt University